Reaktor (Russian for Reactor) is a junior ice hockey club from Nizhnekamsk, Tatarstan, Russia.

Founded in 2009, they compete in the Eastern Conference of the Junior Hockey League - the top tier of Russian junior hockey. The team's home arena is the SCC Arena, and they are affiliated with the Kontinental Hockey League team HC Neftekhimik Nizhnekamsk.

References

External links
 Official website

Ice hockey teams in Russia
Junior Hockey League (Russia) teams
2009 establishments in Russia
Ice hockey clubs established in 2009